The New York Merchandise Mart, also known as 1 Madison Square Plaza, is a building in the Flatiron District of Manhattan, New York City, at 41 Madison Avenue at East 26th Street adjacent to Madison Square Park. The building is a 42-floor, International style skyscraper with an unadorned facade of brown aluminum and darkened black glass, and was designed by Emery Roth & Sons. Completed in 1974, the skyscraper was built for the tableware, decorations and gift industries as a showcase and trade facility. It has 23 floors of showrooms featuring products from 85 manufacturers, and is managed by Rudin Management Company.

The building was constructed on the site of the elaborate mansion of financier, and grandfather of Winston Churchill, Leonard Jerome, built in 1859. The mansion was given landmark status in 1965, but when the owner was unable to find a buyer for it after two years, it was permitted to be torn down in 1967.

See also
Madison Square
Merchandise Mart in Chicago
Rose Hill, Manhattan
Flatiron District

References
Notes

External links

1974 establishments in New York City
Emery Roth buildings
Flatiron District
International style architecture in New York (state)
Madison Avenue
Modernist architecture in New York City
Office buildings completed in 1974
Skyscraper office buildings in Manhattan